Eddie "Devil Boy" Turner is a blues guitarist born in Cuba  and raised in Chicago. A former member of the Otis Taylor band, he is currently signed to Toronto's NorthernBlues Music.

Turner began to play the guitar when he was twelve. He attended the  University of Colorado in the early-1970s, and while there played in the region's first punk/R&B band The Immortal Nightflames, which included Grammy Award nominee Tracy Nelson from Mother Earth. Subsequently, Turner joined the group Zephyr as a guitarist in the ‘70s but after the death of the singer Candy Givens he abandoned music to work in real-estate in Denver.

10 years later, in 1980 Turner agreed to join the Ron Miles electric band. In 1995, he joined Otis Taylor, recording five albums.

In 2006 he was listed among the Best New Artist Debut by the Blues Foundation.

Turner now performs solo as a singer/songwriter. He was the winner of the 6th annual Independent Music Awards Vox Pop vote for best Blues Album The Turner Diaries. His song "Mr. Blues" was nominated for the 8th annual Independent Music Awards for Blues Song of the Year. In January 2011, his song "Miracles and Demons" was nominated for the 10th Annual Independent Music Awards.

Discography
2005 Rise
2006 The Turner Diaries
2010 Miracles & Demons

References

External links
Eddie Turner Official Site
NorthernBlues Music Official Site

Living people
Year of birth missing (living people)
Northern Blues Music artists